Mokhor is a village in Chaldoran-e Jonubi Rural District of the Central District of Chaldoran County, West Azerbaijan province, Iran. At the 2006 National Census, its population was 997 in 162 households. The following census in 2011 counted 1,166 people in 246 households. The latest census in 2016 showed a population of 1,225 people in 274 households; it was the largest village in its rural district.

Etymology 
According to Vladimir Minorsky, the name Mūkhor is derived from the Mongolian word muqur meaning "obtuse, short".

References 

Chaldoran County

Populated places in West Azerbaijan Province

Populated places in Chaldoran County